Sexology was a magazine about the practice of human sexuality, founded by polymath and publisher Hugo Gernsback. It was published in New York City between 1933 and 1983. The magazine had a circulation of up to 200,000 at its peak, and was also known under the titles Sexology Together and Sexology Today. At time of closure, the magazine was published by Medi-Media Publications.

Further reading

References

External links
A selection of covers from Magazineart.org (Archived from the original)

Copyright information from The Online Books Page

Science and technology magazines published in the United States
Defunct magazines published in the United States
Magazines established in 1933
Magazines disestablished in 1983
Magazines published in New York City